Lakeview High School  may refer to:

Lakeview Junior-Senior High School — Campti, Natchitoches Parish, Louisiana
Lakeview High School (Battle Creek, Michigan) — Battle Creek, Michigan
Lakeview High School (St. Clair Shores, Michigan) — St. Clair Shores, Michigan
Lakeview High School (Lakeview, Michigan) — Lakeview, Michigan
Lakeview High School (Minnesota) — Lakeview, Minnesota
Lakeview Junior-Senior High School — Platte County, Nebraska, near Columbus
Lakeview High School (Ohio) — Cortland, Ohio
Lakeview High School (Oregon) — Lakeview, Oregon
Lakeview High School (Pennsylvania) — Stoneboro, Pennsylvania
Lakeview Secondary School (Minnesota) — Cottonwood, Minnesota
Lakeview Technology Academy — Pleasant Prairie, Wisconsin
Lakeview Centennial High School — Garland, Texas

 In Canada 

St. Ignatius High School (Thunder Bay) in Thunder Bay, Ontario, which was formerly called Lakeview High School.
Lakeview Secondary School in Toronto now housing St. Patrick Catholic Secondary School. 

Lake View High School may refer to:
Lake View High School (Chicago, Illinois) — Chicago, Illinois
Lake View High School (Iowa) — Lake View, Iowa
Lake View High School (South Carolina) — Lake View, South Carolina
Lake View High School (San Angelo, Texas) — San Angelo, Texas